George Dundas may refer to:

 George Dundas (1690–1762), MP for Linlithgowshire 1722–1727 and 1741–1743
 George Dundas (Royal Navy officer) (1778–1834), Royal Navy admiral and member of parliament for Richmond, and for Orkney & Shetland
 George Dundas (colonial administrator) (1819–1880), Scottish colonial administrator and member of parliament for Linlithgowshire
 George Dundas, Lord Manor (1802–1869), Scottish judge, Senator of the College of Justice
Sir George Whyte Melville Dundas, 5th Baronet (1856–1934), of the Dundas baronets

See also
Dundas (surname)